Jan Adriaan Hoogendyk (born 28 December 1979), known professionally as Elvis Blue, is a South African musician and songwriter.

Early life
Jan Hoogendyk was born and raised in Johannesburg, South Africa. Hoogendyk is a self-taught musician, teaching himself to play the guitar at the age of 16. During his adolescent years, he started writing his own music and gained experience as a busker on the streets of Johannesburg. During high school, he played in several bands but chose to broaden his experience overseas, busking in London and Scotland.

Musical education 

Hoogendyk's mother, a classical piano teacher, provided him with exposure to classical music throughout his childhood.

When he returned to South Africa, he undertook formal music studies, focusing on piano, guitar, singing and songwriting.

Career

In 2010, Hoogendyk participated in Idols South Africa (season 6). He won the competition with 64% of the votes and shared his prize money with runner-up Lloyd Cele.

Albums
Hoogendyk recorded four albums before winning Idols South Africa, one of which won an ATKV Lier Toekening award and another received a South African Music Awards nomination.

Elvis Blue
Elvis Blue was released in November 2010 and received Gold status 29 days after its release, going platinum in 2011. The album features a duet with Lloyd Cele called 'Little Hero'.

Recording began straight after Hoogendyk won Idols South Africa, and was produced by Brian O'Shea, Crighton Goodwill and Jake Odendaal who are all South African Music Awards Producer of the Year Award winners.

The album combines original songs by Hoogendyk with those of other songwriters.

In April 2012, the double-disc special edition release of Elvis Blue won the SAMA for Best Adult Contemporary Album.

Journey

Hoogendyk travelled to America to co-write new material for Journey with Jeff Franzel, Richard Harris and Pam Sheyne who together composed the hit single, 'Lifeline'.

Journey received the SAMA award for Best Adult Contemporary Album.

Afrikaans
2013: On the day Afrikaans was released, Hoogendyk's first Afrikaans album debuted on the iTunes store chart at #3, making him the first Afrikaans artist to reach its Top Ten ranking.

2014: Afrikaans attained platinum status.

'Seëngebed' (translated from Afrikaans as 'blessing prayer') is Hoogendyk's Afrikaans rendition of Nkosi Sikelel' iAfrika, South Africa's national anthem, and was performed with Afrikaans singer, Coenie de Villiers.

Community upliftment

Hoogendyk supports a variety of community upliftment projects in South Africa.

 Rays of Hope, a community outreach project by Rosebank Union Church, which is a child-headed households project which supports households of children raising younger siblings within the Alexandra Township in northern Johannesburg.   
 Bethesda in George, Western Cape, which provides medical, rehabilitative, developmental, spiritual, psycho-social and family support.   
 Life Community Services which assists the disadvantaged community of George, Western Cape.   
 Elvis Blue Music Academy, in partnership with Life Community Services, provides musical training for children who are unable to afford musical instruments and music tuition.

Awards and nominations

Discography

Singles
2010: Things My Father Said
2011: Lighthouse
2011: Save Me
2012: Right Here, Right Now
2012: Lifeline
2012: That's What We Do
2013: Not Gonna Say Goodbye
2013: Rede om te Glo (Reason to Believe)
2013: Spore (Footprints)
2014: Toe Ons Jonk Was (When We Were Young)
2014: Mooi (Beautiful)
2015: Shine

Albums

2010: Elvis Blue
Track Listing
1. Save Me
2. Lighthouse
3. I'm on Fire
4. Things My Father Said
5. Only Wanna Be With You
6. Little Hero
7. Lightly Tread
8. Lately
9. Right Here, Right Now
10. Lover
11. Stay
12. Believe
13. To Make You Feel My Love

2012: Journey
Track Listing
1.  Glory Road
2.  Lifeline
3.  That's What We Do
4.  Anchor
5.  Not Gonna Say Goodbye
6.  Be More
7.  Journey
8.  All You Need To Know
9.  Come Alive
10. Closer
11. Be The One
12. Never Give Up on You
13. Home

2013: Afrikaans
Track Listing
1. Toe Ons Jonk Was
2. Rede Om Te Glo
3. Mooi
4. Horison
5. Dromer
6. Vriende
7. Hoop in Die Donker
8. Liefling
9. Spore
10. Steel
11. R20 000
12. Hillbrow

Gallery

References

External links

 Elvis Blue Music Academy
 Elvis Blue YouTube Channel

21st-century South African male singers
Idols South Africa winners
1979 births
Living people